Cheddington railway station serves the village of Cheddington, in Buckinghamshire, England, and the surrounding villages, including Ivinghoe and Mentmore. It is operated by London Northwestern Railway, which also provides all services.

The station has four platforms, each with 12 carriage capacity, but only platforms 3 and 4 are used regularly and platforms 1 and 2 are used only during engineering works and disruption. Platforms 2 and 3 form a centre island. The main station buildings are located on Platform 1 adjacent to the car park. Access to the other platforms is gained by a footbridge.

The ticket office closed on 28 March 2013 and the station is now unstaffed. Although starting in December 2017 there is a security guard on the station around the clock, the ticket building is still closed.

Cheddington was formerly a junction for the London & North Western Railway's branch line to Aylesbury High Street. This branch terminated in the east of Aylesbury and made no connection to the GCR/Metropolitan Railway station in that town. The branch closed to passengers in 1953 but with freight services continuing until 1964. The trackless edge of the Aylesbury branch platform is still in evidence at Cheddington and part of the old track bed of the branch is now used as the station's approach road.

Services
All services at Cheddington are operated by London Northwestern Railway.

The typical off-peak service in trains per hour is:
 2 tph to London Euston
 2 tph to 

References

External links

 

Railway stations in Buckinghamshire
DfT Category E stations
Former London and Birmingham Railway stations
Railway stations in Great Britain opened in 1838
Railway stations served by West Midlands Trains
1838 establishments in the United Kingdom
Stations on the West Coast Main Line